Moresby Island is in the Haida Gwaii archipelago of British Columbia, Canada.

Moresby Island may also refer to:

 Moresby Island (Gulf Islands), in the Gulf Islands of British Columbia
 Moresby Island (Peros Banhos), an island on the Peros Banhos Atoll in the Chagos Archipelago of the British Indian Ocean Territory